Norayr Sargsyan (born September 25, 1974 in Parakar, Armenian SSR) is an Armenian retired gymnast. He competed at the 1996 Summer Olympics.

References

External links
Sports-Reference.com

1974 births
Living people
People from Parakar
Armenian male artistic gymnasts
Olympic gymnasts of Armenia
Gymnasts at the 1996 Summer Olympics